Martinac is a village in Croatia.

Populated places in Bjelovar-Bilogora County